Border Feud is a 1947 American Western film directed by Ray Taylor and written by Patricia Harper. The film stars Lash LaRue, Al St. John, Ian Keith, Gloria Marlen, Kenneth Farrell, Ed Cassidy, Bob Duncan, Casey MacGregor and Buster Slaven. The film was released on May 10, 1947, by Producers Releasing Corporation.

Plot

Cast          
Lash LaRue as Marshal Cheyenne Davis
Al St. John as Sheriff Fuzzy Q. Jones
Ian Keith as Doc Peters
Gloria Marlen as Carol Condon
Kenneth Farrell as Bob Hart 
Ed Cassidy as Sheriff Steele
Bob Duncan as Jack Barton
Casey MacGregor as Jed Young
Buster Slaven as Jim Condon 
Mikel Conrad as Elmore

References

External links
 

1947 films
American Western (genre) films
1947 Western (genre) films
Producers Releasing Corporation films
Films directed by Ray Taylor
American black-and-white films
1940s English-language films
1940s American films